The Calcutta flag was one of the first unofficial flags of India. It was designed by Sachindra Prasad Bose and Hemchandra Kanungo and unfurled on 7 August 1906 at Parsi Bagan Square (Girish Park), Calcutta.

The flag had three horizontal bands of equal width with the top being orange, the centre yellow and the bottom green in colour. It had eight half-opened lotus flowers on the top stripe representing the eight provinces of British India and a picture of the sun and an Islamic-style crescent moon on the bottom stripe. वन्देमातरम् (Vande Mataram, meaning "Mother, I bow to thee!") was inscribed in the centre in Devanagari.

See also
Flags of India

References 

Flags of India
20th century in Kolkata
Unofficial flags
Flags introduced in 1906
1906 in India